is a Japanese series of visual combat books published by Hobby Japan inspired by the licensed works from Firelight Game Company's  Lost Worlds. The overall plot of the game revolves around a tournament called the Queen's Blade, which is held once every four years to determine a Queen.

Since its original release, the series has evolved into a media franchise, spanning four manga adaptations, three anime adaptations, three light novels, and a video game adaptation. Figures of the characters made by various manufacturers, such as Kaiyodo with their Revoltech series, have also been produced along with several memorabilia. A sequel series, Queen's Blade Rebellion, was launched in 2009.

Story

In the Continent, a tournament called the Queen's Blade is held once every four years to determine the most beautiful and powerful Queen. The overall story of Queen's Blade focuses on Leina, the heiress of the esteemed Vance Family and next in line for the throne, as she travels to Gainos, encountering many other warriors also competing in the Queen's Blade for their own intentions.

The original gamebooks feature characters designed by many popular artists, including Hirokazu Hisayuki (My-HiME), Kazuhiro Takamura, and Eiwa.

Media

Gamebooks
Series 1 (Leina and Risty) - Released November 25, 2005.
Series 2 (Irma and Nowa) - Released December 28, 2005.
Series 3 (Tomoe and Echidna) - Released June 9, 2006.
Series 4 (Menace and Elina) - Released September 29, 2006.
Series 5 (Airi and Leina 3D) - Released December 22, 2006.
Series 6 (Nanael and Cattleya) - Released March 16, 2007.
Series 7 (Nyx and Melpha) - Released June 29, 2007.
Series 8 (Melona and Claudette) - Released October 18, 2007.
Series 9 (Ymir) - Released February 15, 2008.
A limited-edition second-player color version of Ymir was distributed exclusively by online hobby shop Post Channel.
Series 10 (Aldra and Alleyne) - Released June 20, 2008.

At Anime Expo 2010, Hobby Japan announced that English translations of the gamebooks will be released in North America. There exist English versions for the characters Alleyne, Melona, Nanael and Tomoe.

Anime

An anime adaptation of Queen's Blade, entitled , was produced by ARMS. Directed by Kinji Yoshimoto, the anime aired twelve episodes in Japan from April 2 to June 18, 2009 on AT-X, with subsequent broadcasts on Chiba TV, Sun Television, and Tokyo MX. The series aired uncensored on AT-X, while being heavily censored on other channels. Six DVD and Blu-ray volumes were released by Media Factory between June 25, 2009 and November 25, 2009, each DVD/BD volume containing one of six OVAs. A second season, aired on AT-X and other channels from September 24 to December 10, 2009. Six DVD/BD volumes were released by Media Factory between December 22, 2009 and May 25, 2010, each containing six OVAs which continue from the first six.

An OVA series, called , was announced on the May issue of Monthly Hobby Japan. A prelude to events of Queen's Blade Rebellion, the series takes place after the events of the Queen's Blade tournament and chronicles the characters on their separate paths. The episodes were released on six DVD and Blu-ray volumes from August 25, 2010 to March 30, 2011.

In North America, the first and second anime adaptations are licensed by Media Blasters under the respective titles Queen's Blade: The Exiled Virgin and Queen's Blade 2: The Evil Eye. The first season was released between May 18 and October 26, 2010 as three DVD volumes, each containing four episodes, while the second season was released between May 24, 2011 and July 19, 2011 as two half-series volumes. Blu-ray box sets of the two seasons were later released on February 15, 2011 and September 27, 2011, respectively. Sentai Filmworks has licensed the Beautiful Fighters OVAs and will release them on digital and home video formats. On May 11, 2017, the channel Toku announced that the first season would be broadcast on its channel beginning June 5, 2017 through August 21, 2017.

Manga
An anthology comic of Queen's Blade was published by Hobby Japan with four volumes released between April 25, 2007 and February 25, 2008. A manga adaptation centered on Leina illustrated by Kabao Kikkawa was serialized in the October 2008 issue of Media Factory's seinen manga magazine Monthly Comic Alive. Three volumes were released between February 2, 2009 and January 23, 2010 under Media Factory's Alive Comics imprint.

Another manga adaptation of Queen's Blade illustrated by Iku Nanazuki called , began serialization in the December 2007 issue of Comp Ace. A spinoff of the original, the series centers on Elina searching for her older sister Leina, and it introduces Frolell, a servant of the Vance family who travels with Elina on her journey to bring Leina back. Five volumes were released by Kadokawa Shoten between June 26, 2008 and June 26, 2010.

A third manga adaptation, called , is illustrated by AstroguyII and began serialization in the December 2007 issue of Dengeki Black Maoh, and continued in Dengeki Maoh after the latter stopped circulation, albeit with new chapters delivered bimonthly. The first volume was released by ASCII Media Works on March 27, 2009, with four volumes currently available as of February 27, 2012 under their Dengeki Comics imprint.

Light novels
A light novel adaptation of Queen's Blade, called , is written by Eiji Okita with illustrations by Eiwa. The first volume was released on April 27, 2007 by Hobby Japan under their HJ Bunko imprint, and released five volumes until November 1, 2008. A bonus novel called  was published on March 1, 2008, with illustrations provided by Hirotaka Akaga.

A light novel based on the first anime series, written by Okita and illustrated by Tsumotu Miyazawa, was also published by Hobby Japan, and released two volumes between August 1, 2009 and October 1, 2009.

Video game
A role-playing game called  was developed by Bandai Namco Games for the PlayStation Portable. It was released on December 17, 2009, and features all-new characters and an original storyline exclusive to the game in addition to recurring characters from the original series. A limited edition of the game, called the Gekitō Pack, was also released, featuring a Cute figure from Figma and a bonus character voice CD. A sequel, Queen's Gate: Spiral Chaos, was released as part of the Queen's Gate series of works.

Other
Queen's Blade Fan Disc: character dress-up software published in 2006.
Queen's Blade i: A mobile phone game using game rules from the combat picture book series. Service host by DigitalMediaLab and it supports FOMA 703i and 901i series. Carriers include NTT DoCoMo. The service seems to have been discontinued since.
Queen's Blade Collection Card ver.2.0: A currently-produced card series with individual biography cards for each character, plus artwork cards and bubble gum.
Three visual books called  were released by Hobby Japan, narrating the backstories of the fighters before the tournament:
, illustrated by Eiwa, released on Abril 28, 2007.
, illustrated by F.S., released on February 15, 2008.
, illustrated by Hirokazu Hisayuki, released on February 28, 2009.
A databook called  was released by Hobby Japan on June 27, 2009. Aside from compiled illustrations from other official sources, the databook contains extended profiles on the fighters, a "world guide" detailing many of the Continent's locations and the resolutions of each character's storyarc. The book is licensed under the title Queen's Blade: Perfect Visual Collection in North America by Vertical Publishing.
Queen's Blade: The Duel: A collectible card game with Queen's Blade characters, later expanded with a few of the Queen's Gate and Queen's Blade Rebellion characters and renamed to Duel System TCG. Released by Megahobby in 2008.
Queen's Blade: The Conquest: An RPG Browser game featuring the Queen's Blade characters made by Aiming in 2012, with plans to be expanded with Rebellion characters. It is free-to-play, though items can be bought to progress faster and reduce cooldown time.

Sequels and spin-offs
The original game book series was followed by a sequel series titled , featuring all-new characters as well as reinterpretations of previous characters, and a supplement called , featuring licensed characters from other games and series.

A spin-off series of Original video animations, titled , was launched in 2016. The anime is set in a parallel universe inspired by fairy tales.

A reboot, titled , was announced in 2017.

References

External links
Official site 
Official anime website 
Queen's Gate official site 
Flying Buffalo's Queen's Blade Page
Queen's Gate: Spiral Chaos official site 
Queen's Blade: Spiral Chaos official site 
Queen's Blade The Duel official page  
Queen's Blade The Conquest official page 
Arms Corporation page: QB1, QBR
Queen's Blade: The Exiled Virgin at Media Blasters

Queen's Blade
2007 Japanese novels
2008 Japanese novels
2009 anime television series debuts
2009 Japanese novels
2010 anime OVAs
Adventure anime and manga
Anime Works
AT-X (TV network) original programming
Arms Corporation
ASCII Media Works manga
Dengeki Comics
Fantasy anime and manga
Gamebooks
HJ Bunko
Kadokawa Dwango franchises
Kadokawa Shoten manga
Light novels
Media Factory manga
Mass media franchises
Seinen manga
Sentai Filmworks
Sword and sorcery anime and manga
Yuri (genre) anime and manga